San Juan or Ancos Punta is a mountain in the Andes of Peru. It is located in the region of Ancash and is part of the Cordillera Blanca mountain range, a sub-range of the Andes. It is located northwest of mount Huantsán.

References 

Mountains of Peru
Mountains of Ancash Region